Juneda is a village in the province of Lleida and autonomous community of Catalonia, Spain. The municipality is split into two parts, the bigger southern part having almost all the population.

References

External links
 Government data pages 

Municipalities in Garrigues (comarca)